Teresa Fernández (born 15 October 1949) is a Spanish archer. She competed in the women's individual event at the 1992 Summer Olympics.

References

1949 births
Living people
Spanish female archers
Olympic archers of Spain
Archers at the 1992 Summer Olympics
Sportspeople from Oviedo